Morgan Sindall Group plc is a leading British Construction & Regeneration group, headquartered in London employing around 6,700 employees and operating in the public, regulated and private sectors.  It reports through six divisions of Construction & Infrastructure, Fit Out, Property Services, Partnership Housing, Urban Regeneration and Investments.  It is listed on the London Stock Exchange and is a constituent of the FTSE 250 Index.

History
The company was founded by John Morgan and Jack Lovell with £1,000 from joint savings in 1977 and was initially based at Golden Square in Soho. Overbury, a fit out contractor which had been in business since 1942, was acquired by the company in 1985. The company secured a listing on the London Stock Exchange in 1994 when it entered into a reverse takeover of William Sindall plc.

William Sindall was established in the 1860s, and was named for its founder, who was known for his work for the University of Cambridge. In 1988, William Sindall had acquired Hinkins & Frewin, a company established in 1847, known for their work for the University of Oxford. The business operated from offices in Oxford, Cambridge, Banbury, Rugby and Fareham.

In 1998, Morgan Sindall bought Lovell Partnerships for £15m from the financially stretched Lovell Group. The business was one of the largest partnership housing operations in the country, and it also contained a private housebuilding division.

In June 2007, Morgan Sindall Group purchased the construction arm of AMEC. In September 2010, it purchased the repairs division of Connaught plc.

In 2009 the company was fined £287,000 for its involvement in cover pricing activities. The company subsequently announced that it had carried out a comprehensive review of its activities.

Operations
Morgan Sindall Group is a construction company and regeneration group operating in the public and commercial sectors. It operates through six divisions of construction and infrastructure, fit out, property services, partnership housing, urban regeneration and investments.

Major projects
Major projects included the expansion of Whitechapel station for Crossrail completed in 2021 and construction of six new stations on the Northumberland Line due to be completed in 2024.

References

External links
 Official Group website

Construction and civil engineering companies of the United Kingdom
Construction and civil engineering companies established in 1977
Companies based in the City of Westminster
1977 establishments in England
British companies established in 1977